The Genoese East India Company (Italian: Compagnia di Negotio or Compagnia Genovese delle indie orientali) was established by Genoa in early 1649 to profit off of the East India trade. Its first expedition, led by Jan Maes van Duijnkerken, resulted in the capture of the ships and the crew by the VOC at Batavia. Its successor, the Compagnia Marittima di San Giorgio, sent a few ships to Brazil but soon ceased operation.

References 

Trading companies established in the 17th century
Trading companies disestablished in the 17th century
Colonial Indian companies
1647 establishments in Europe
Defunct companies of Italy
Shipping companies of Italy
History of Genoa